The Fire Services Association is a trade union in Trinidad and Tobago.

See also

 List of trade unions

Trade unions in Trinidad and Tobago
Firefighters associations